This page details the statistics of the First League of the Republika Srpska in the 2001–02 season.

At the end of the season, the top six clubs joined the Premier League of Bosnia and Herzegovina, to form the first nationwide football league of Bosnia and Herzegovina.

Clubs and stadiums

League standings

See also
2001–02 Premier League of Bosnia and Herzegovina

External links
 FSRS Official website

Srpska 1
2001–02 in Bosnia and Herzegovina football
First League of the Republika Srpska seasons